Datousaurus (meaning "chieftain lizard" or "big-head lizard"; originally named using the Malay datu, after its Chinese nickname qiulong - literally "chieftain dragon" - but also a pun on its big head; da tou means "big head" in Chinese) was a dinosaur from the Middle Jurassic. It was a sauropod collected from the Lower Shaximiao Formation in Dashanpu, Zigong Sichuan province, China. It shared the local Middle Jurassic landscape with other sauropods such as Shunosaurus, Omeisaurus, Protognathosaurus, the ornithopod Xiaosaurus, the early stegosaur Huayangosaurus as well as the carnivorous Gasosaurus.

Discovery and species
 
Datousaurus was named by Dong Zhiming and Tang in 1984. To date, only two partial skeletons have been discovered. Neither had an articulated skull, although one skull has been discovered that has been attributed to the genus.

D. bashanensis is the only established species.

Paleobiology
Datousaurus was about 15 metres long and herbivorous. It had a deep large skull for a sauropod. The rarity of its fossils suggest that it may not have been as social as other sauropods, which are often preserved in large numbers in a single deposit.

Datousaurus and Shunosaurus
Datousaurus and Shunosaurus were both closely related animals with similar anatomies. However, Datousaurus's elongated vertebrae gave it a higher reach and its teeth were more spoon shaped. This may be a sign that these contemporaries fed on different plants and/or at different heights in the trees. This strategy may have reduced competition between the two genera. A similar pattern of height difference possibly associated with feeding behaviors is found in the diplodocids.

References
 Creisler B, 'Chinese Dinosaurs:Naming The Dragons' The Dinosaur Report, Fall 1994, pp16–17
 

Middle Jurassic dinosaurs of Asia
Mamenchisaurids
Fossil taxa described in 1984
Taxa named by Dong Zhiming
Paleontology in Sichuan